Sue Harrison (born 1950) is an author who wrote two trilogies of novels, the Ivory Carver Trilogy and the Storyteller Trilogy.

External links
Mother Earth, Father Sky Review, Los Angeles Times
Brother Wind Review, Publishers Weekly

American women novelists
Living people
1950 births
Date of birth missing (living people)
Place of birth missing (living people)
21st-century American women writers